Danny Robert Worsnop (born 4 September 1990) is an English singer most prominently known as the lead vocalist of rock bands Asking Alexandria and We Are Harlot. He has worked with several artists including I See Stars, With One Last Breath, Breathe Carolina, Memphis May Fire, The Word Alive, All That Remains, and Testarossa, providing guest vocals on several songs.

Worsnop also maintains a solo music career. He released his debut solo full-length country-inspired studio album, The Long Road Home, in 2017. He has since released his second studio album Shades of Blue in 2019 through Sumerian Records, followed by the two standalone singles "Another You" and "Happy".

Early life 
Danny Worsnop was born on 4 September 1990 in Beverley, England and grew up in the small village of Gilberdyke with his parents Philip and Sharon and his younger sister Kelly. Worsnop himself has stated that his love for music started when he was a toddler when he would make "beats" using empty boxes and pots, but started playing instruments at the age of 8, his first being the violin and took lessons to play it, a year later learning the trumpet, and another year later he was playing at his local village school orchestra. Eventually he would take up guitar and bass and became more influenced by rock and metal music, and was self-taught. He initially planned to join the military in hopes of becoming a sniper, however the success of Asking Alexandria's debut album Stand Up and Scream convinced him to continue a music career.

Music career

2008–2015, 2016–present: Asking Alexandria 

Although Ben Bruce originally formed the band in Dubai in 2006, after he realized that he wouldn't be able to achieve international success in Dubai, he moved to Nottingham in England in 2008 and reassembled the band with new members from the York area, including lead singer Danny Worsnop, Ben had moved in with Danny at his parents home Gilberdyke. He carried the name over due to not wanting to bother to come up with a brand new name, so he stuck with the old one. When asked why he chose that particular name, he explained that "Most bands have a pretty shit band name, so I just came up with something. I came up with Alexandria as a human name, because people relate to humans", although the reason for using the word 'asking' is not explained.

The band released their first official debut album titled Stand Up and Scream in 2009 via Sumerian and Victory records, produced by Joey Sturgis. Although it did not chart in the UK, it did chart in the US, peaking at 4 in the Top Heatseekers, 24 in the Top Hard Rock Albums and 29 in the Top Independent Albums. The band's second album, titled Reckless and Relentless, was released in 2011 via Sumerian records, which again featured Joey Sturgis. This time, the album did chart in the UK, peaking at 7 on the UK Rock Chart, and also charted in Australia at 30 on the Australian Albums Chart. They released their third album, titled From Death to Destiny in 2013 via Sumerian Records and peaked in the US at 5 and the Top Hard Rock Albums at 1, and also charted in the UK at 28 and in Australia at 11, making it their most commercially successful album to date.

On 22 January 2015, Danny Worsnop announced on his departure from the band, stating that he wants what's best for the band hence his departure, and also to focus on his new band We Are Harlot, despite this departure the band will be touring and also recording a new album, despite no further announcements being made about his replacement. Fans reacted to news in distress as they believe he was essential to the band's sound, while others were not surprised by his career move, some going as far to say he performs better with his new band We Are Harlot than he does with Asking Alexandria.

Worsnop himself has explained that he loved being a part of Asking Alexandria but he no longer wanted to create heavy music, stating that even if We Are Harlot didn't exist, he would have left the band anyway. He further commented that he also grew apart from the rest of the band musically and had reached a point where he wanted to do different things, hence the change from a metal band to a hard rock band. While Ben Bruce has admitted that the band is happier without Worsnop, he continued to show support for Asking Alexandria after they released their first single, "I Won't Give In", featuring Denis Stoff as the main vocalist with a positive response on his social media. When Worsnop was asked if he would ever return to making metal music online he responded with "Not opposed to it, but nothing planned at this point in time."

On 21 October 2016, guitarist Ben Bruce confirmed that Worsnop had officially reunited with Asking Alexandria after parting ways with Stoff around 18 months.

2011–present: We Are Harlot 

In multiple interviews Danny Worsnop mentioned this band and referred to it as 'Harlot', which he has explained that after touring with Asking Alexandria in 2013, he would be touring with this band and release an album, along with his solo album in the near future. The band was formed three years prior to the events of 2014 after Worsnop and Jeff George formerly of Sebastian Bach, who shared the same lawyer Eric German, had met in Los Angeles on New Year's Eve, and within two days the pair bonded and moved in together as roommates at Worsnop's Beverley Hills home.

After discussing their musical endeavours, Worsnop invited Bruno Agra, formerly of Revolution Renaissance, and the three started to make demos based on Agra's former band. This was initially going to be used as material for Worsnop's solo album, but once they met Brian Weaver from Silvertide, who became part of the band after they advertised the role for a full-time bassist, it grew into the band. The band released their debut album on 30 March 2015. When asked if he preferred to perform with We Are Harlot or Asking Alexandria, Worsnop said that he disliked that question and that they are two opposites, with the statement "It's like comparing Aerosmith and Metallica."

The band's debut self-titled album was successfully released on 30 March and peaked in the US at 165 and in the UK at 58, it sold 5,000 copies in the US alone within its debut week and was well received by critics. The band recently stated that they will be releasing a second album in February 2017, and despite Worsnop's return to Asking Alexandria, they will not be sidelined in any way.

2011–present: Solo project 
Worsnop is to be releasing a solo album, however since announcement in 2011 he had only released a 50-second clip of the song Photograph via YouTube. In an interview with Artisan News Service Danny has said that he is expecting to release the album by Easter of 2014. In a Facebook post on 20 December 2013, he also stated that he is working with producer Jay Ruston, and that the album would be released through Sumerian Records, however this is not the case after his announcements in 2016.

In September 2015 in an interview with Altpress he stated that he was in the middle of recording his album, and that was doing so with country and blues music in mind, stating that he was a country boy when he grew up in England. He has also worked with songwriters Hillary Lindsey and John Paul White, and is also working with producer Jim Kaufman. He also stated that his solo project will include music videos and hopes it will be a success, however admitted that there are no plans to tour per se. In early December Worsnop officially announced that his debut solo album will in fact be released in 2016, and gave insight on the album's lyrical and musical influences, such as the fact that the album will include his past dealings with drugs, alcoholism, and his rehabilitation along with his other "dark demons".

He goes on to say that he wrote the album intensely in a week and recorded the whole album live and raw in his Kaufman's living room, he also funded the project himself and oversaw every single aspect of the album's making, including its artwork of which he created and the music videos which he had written and directed himself, the album's recording officially ended in early February. Later the same month he released an album cover and the album's title, "The Prozac Sessions", and stated that he was in Nashville to find a label to release the album on. He also mentioned that there will be four variations of the album's artwork and possibly variations of bonus tracks to accommodate them. In early March Worsnop unveiled a series of song teasers and all four album covers on his website, and stated on his social media that he will be announcing debut live performances soon.

The first single released off of the album was "I Got Bones" in early April 2016, and was accompanied by a music video. The song itself is considered to be mostly country with blues mixed in, with Worsnop's vocals delivering some more powerful moments. Along with the single release the album itself became available for preorder.

On 26 September 2016, Worsnop announced through an Instagram post that the upcoming album will no longer be called The Prozac Sessions due to legal reasons. The name was changed to The Long Road Home.

On 10 May 2019, Danny released his second solo album Shades of Blue through Sumerian Records with more music in the works for an upcoming 2020 album release, including new singles "Another You" and "Happy", which Danny says "a song I wrote about my never being content or satisfied. My constant need to do more and be better. The want to be able to slow down but the awareness that I never will."

Other media 
Worsnop has written an autobiography titled "Am I Insane?", which has not been released yet. An excerpt of it was released on 31 July 2013. In an interview with Wayde Flowerday of MusicReview.co.za, Danny stated that he had been working on the book for two years, and it should hopefully be ready by sometime in 2015. However, as of 2021, the book has not been released.

In his biography on his website, he has stated that he is also a photographer and that he will be releasing some of his works on charity auctions at some point in the future. Danny has said in a Facebook post that he is organising an auction for 2014.

In February 2015 Worsnop made his first film acting debut as a guest star in a film created by Sumerian Records titled "What Now" written and directed by Ash Avildsen, owner of the record company. Later in the year it was also announced that he would have a role in the latest The Devil's Carnival film, Alleluia! The Devil's Carnival, stating that Darren Bousman, Terrance Zdunich and Sean DeMott invited him to the first film's premiere in Los Angeles, after which he was invited to be in its sequel, while he was excited he had to cancel since it initially clashed with tour times, however, after the tour was cancelled he asked to be involved again and was written into the film to play the part of the blacksmith-type character called "the Smith". After his involvement he went and got a manager and an agent and is looking for another project. He has also appeared in Average Joe, a comedy on YouTube, written and produced by Andy Biersack's cousin, Joe Flanders.

Personal life 
Worsnop has had a history of substance abuse and alcoholism, even appearing intoxicated during a 2011 performance by Asking Alexandria, which eventually led to Worsnop seeking help via drug rehabilitation. Snippets from the audio of the incident were included on the intro part of the song "Don't Pray for Me" from the band's third studio album From Death to Destiny, released in 2013. In 2012, in between recording sessions of the album, he suffered a near-death drug overdose. In an interview with Genius, he said "It was right after Mitch Lucker passed, so I was in a massive dark hole." Heavy drug use caused him to convulse, so he called a previous girlfriend who rushed him to rehab. Worsnop said the woman "saved my life." He dedicated the song "Room 138" to the incident—the room where Worsnop overdosed in the Grafton hotel in Los Angeles. The song is the closing track on the band's self-titled fifth album. According to Ben Bruce, Worsnop re-joined the band in 2016 "completely sober".

During his initial leaving of Asking Alexandria in January 2015, he fell into conflict with some of the other members, particularly Ben Bruce, who was said to be his "best friend". Their friendship rekindled in 2016, leading to his rejoining of Asking Alexandria.

From 2016 to 2017 Worsnop was in a relationship with a Nashville-based country singer Sarah Ross. He performed guest vocals on the song "All I Want To Know" from her Nervous Breakdown EP released in 2018.

On 12 January 2018, during a VIP meet and greet session before the show in Kansas City, Missouri, Worsnop met Victoria Potter, an active member of the United States Navy personnel at the time; the two began dating later that month. On 5 August 2018, during a show in Columbus, Ohio, Worsnop proposed to Potter. In 2019, the pair were married. The couple separated in late 2021 and finalized their divorce in 2022.

Worsnop is also a legal gun owner and is a supporter of the Second Amendment.

Discography

As solo artist

Studio albums

Singles

Music videos

Compilation contributions

Collaborations

As official member 
The following is series of lists that include albums and singles released by bands when Danny Worsnop was an official band member.

Albums

Singles

Filmography

References

External links

English rock singers
1990 births
Living people
Sumerian Records artists
Asking Alexandria members
21st-century English singers
21st-century British male singers